Sedimentisphaerales is an order of aquatic bacteria.

See also
 List of bacterial orders
 List of bacteria genera

References

Planctomycetota
Bacteria orders